Richard E Holz (30 October 1914 – August 15, 1986), was an American brass band composer, served as Chaplain to the U.S. Air Force in New Guinea, Philippines and Japan.  He married Ruby Walker in 1941. After the war, Holz was active in the Salvation Army.

References

1914 births
1986 deaths
American male composers
American Salvationists
United States Air Force chaplains
20th-century American composers
20th-century American male musicians
20th-century Methodists